Richmond Airport may refer to:

Australia
 Richmond Airport (Queensland) in Richmond, Queensland (IATA: RCM)
 RAAF Base Richmond in New South Wales (IATA: XRH – ICAO: YSRI)

United States
 Richmond Airport (Rhode Island) in Richmond, Rhode Island (FAA: 08R)
 Richmond Field in Gregory, Michigan (FAA: 69G)
 Richmond International Airport in Richmond, Virginia (FAA/IATA: RIC)
 Richmond Municipal Airport in Richmond, Indiana (FAA/IATA: RID)

See also
 Vancouver International Airport in Richmond, British Columbia (IATA/TC: YVR)